Radoy Ralin (April 23, 1922 – July 22, 2004), born Dimitar Stoyanov, was a Bulgarian dissident, poet, and satirist.

After the downfall of the communist regime, he was urged to run for Parliament, but adamantly refused.

His works have been translated into 37 languages.

Honours 
Radoy Ralin Peak on Livingston Island in the South Shetland Islands, Antarctica is named after Radoy Ralin.

Notes

External links
 Radoy Ralin's profile at the web page of the Bulgarian National Radio
 
 

1922 births
2004 deaths
Bulgarian male poets
Writers from Sliven
20th-century Bulgarian poets
20th-century male writers